Athlone is a major town and River Shannon crossing in County Westmeath in Ireland.

Athlone may also refer to:

In geography:
(by country)
 Athlone, Victoria, Australia
 Athlone, Edmonton, a neighbourhood in Edmonton, Canada
 Athlone, Newfoundland and Labrador, Canada
 Athlone, Cape Town, South Africa
 Athlone Park, a coastal suburb south of Durban, South Africa 
 Athlone, California, United States
 Athlone, Michigan, United States
 Athlone, Harare, Zimbabwe, a suburb of Harare

In politics:

 Athlone (Parliament of Ireland constituency), a constituency represented in the Irish House of Commons until 1800
 Athlone (UK Parliament constituency), a former United Kingdom Parliament constituency

Others:
 the Earl of Athlone, a title in the Peerage of Ireland (and later in the Peerage of the United Kingdom)
 Athlone Radio Station, the first high-power broadcasting station of Ireland situated at Athlone
 Athlone Castle
 The Athlone Press, an academic publishing company with offices in London and New York
 Athlone Pursuivant a heraldic officer